Stride Health, Inc. is a California startup focused on connecting individuals with health plans under the Affordable Care Act. Its approach to the marketplace has led to coverage from Wired Magazine, re/code, the San Francisco Chronicle and others. It is backed by New Enterprise Associates and Venrock.

Services
According to Wired, the company exploits "a failing of the new federal and state health insurance marketplaces: a lack of quick recommendations tailored to specific needs of consumers." It provides a search service for consumers to find a health plan that fits their unique needs and circumstances, "such as age, gender, illnesses, medications, doctors they want to see and smoking habits." Other sources refer to this service as a "recommendation engine."

In January 2015, Stride Health launched a new mobile-focused version of its healthcare recommendation engine.

Personnel
The company was founded by Noah Lang (formerly of Reputation.com) and Matt Butner (formerly of [R/GA]).

References

Health information technology companies